Cecily Parsley's Nursery Rhymes is a children's book written and illustrated by Beatrix Potter, and published by Frederick Warne & Co. in December 1922. The book is a compilation of traditional English nursery rhymes such as "Goosey Goosey Gander", "This Little Piggy" and "Three Blind Mice". The title character is a rabbit who brews ale for gentlemen.

It was Potter's second book of rhymes published by Warne, with the first one being Appley Dapply's Nursery Rhymes. Merchandise generated from the book includes Beswick Pottery porcelain figurines and Schmid music boxes.

References 
Footnotes

Works cited

External links

1922 children's books
British children's books
British picture books
Collections of nursery rhymes
Books about birds
Books about cats
Books about mice and rats
Books about pigs
Books about rabbits and hares
Picture books by Beatrix Potter
Frederick Warne & Co books